URC may stand for:

Church
 United Reformed Church, a Christian denomination in Great Britain
 United Reformed Churches in North America

Companies
 Uganda Railways Corporation, operates railways in Uganda 
 United Refining Company, an oil company in Pennsylvania, United States
 Urban Regeneration Company, a type of company in the United Kingdom
 Universal Robina Corporation, a Filipino food and beverage company

Rugby
 Undeb Rygbi Cymru, the Welsh-language name for the Welsh Rugby Union
 Under-19s Rugby Championship, an Australian tournament for junior men's teams
 United Rugby Championship, for rugby union clubs in Ireland, Italy, Scotland, South Africa, and Wales

Science and technology
 Universal remote or "universal remote control"
 Universal Remote Console, defined by ISO/IEC 24752
 Uniform Resource Characteristics, a computing term
 Universal rotation curve,  a unified description of galactic rotation curves
 University Rover Challenge, an annual  competition for college students, by the Mars Society
 Unsolicited Result Code in Hayes AT Command

Other
 Union Revolutionary Council, the supreme governing body of Burma from 1962 to 1974
 Ürümqi Diwopu International Airport, China (IATA code) 
 Utility regulatory commission
 Universal Races Congress, an international meeting on racial understanding in 1911 in London